Nikolai Paltsev (3 January 1949 – 1 December 2021) was a Russian politician. A member of United Russia, he served as mayor of Stavropol from 2008 to 2011.

References

1949 births
2021 deaths
21st-century Russian politicians
Communist Party of the Soviet Union members
United Russia politicians
People from Stavropol